Big Fat Liar is a 2002 American teen comedy film, directed by Shawn Levy, adapted by Dan Schneider from a story by Schneider and Brian Robbins, and starring Frankie Muniz, Paul Giamatti, Amanda Bynes, Amanda Detmer, Donald Faison, Lee Majors, and Russell Hornsby.

The film is about a 14-year-old compulsive liar, Jason Shepherd (Muniz), whose creative writing assignment "Big Fat Liar" is stolen by an arrogant Hollywood screenwriter and producer, Marty Wolf (Giamatti), who later plans to use it to make the fictional film of the same name. The film is an allusion to the Aesop's Fable, The Boy Who Cried Wolf, with Jason Shepherd being analogous to the shepherd boy in the story and Marty Wolf, analogous to the wolf. It was released in the United States on February 8, 2002.

Plot
Jason Shepherd is a 14-year-old compulsive liar living in the fictional town of Greenbury, Michigan who tries to lie his way out of a creative writing assignment, but gets caught by his English teacher, who alerts his parents. He is given three hours to submit his essay and avoid repeating English in summer school. Inspired by his talent for lying, Jason writes a story titled "Big Fat Liar". While riding his sister's old bike to turn in the essay, Jason is accidentally run over by the limousine of an arrogant Hollywood screenwriter and producer, Marty Wolf, and he convinces Marty to give him a ride. Marty, also a compulsive liar, is in town shooting his film Whitaker and Fowl. In a rush, Jason accidentally leaves his essay in the limo when it falls out of his backpack. Inspired, Marty keeps the story for himself. Realizing his essay is missing, Jason tries to explain what happened, but he is sent to summer school.

Jason and his best friend, Kaylee, discover Marty has plagiarized Jason's essay into a film when they see a theatrical trailer. They fly to Los Angeles while their parents are out of town for the weekend and sneak into Marty's studio office to request that Marty confess to his parents, but he purposefully burns Jason's essay and calls security to remove them. Angered, the two plot to inconvenience him until he confesses. Marty's former limo driver and struggling actor, Frank Jackson, agrees to help. Jason and Kaylee sabotage Marty through pranks such as dying his skin blue via his swimming pool and his hair orange via his shampoo. They also superglue his headset to his ear; trick him into going to a child's birthday party, where the children mistake him for the hired clown and attack him; and tamper with his car's controls. Marty's car is also rear-ended by a cranky elderly woman into a monster truck owned by the Masher, a wrestler, who destroys it.

Marty plans to produce Big Fat Liar with Universal Pictures, but new president Marcus Duncan, seeing the commercial and critical failure of Whitaker and Fowl, declines to approve the budget, so Jason agrees to help Marty in exchange for his confession to his parents. With Jason's advice, Marty makes a successful presentation and gets the film approved by Universal, but Marty subsequently betrays Jason and calls security to remove him and Kaylee again. Marty's abused assistant, Monty Kirkham, offers to help Jason and Kaylee expose him. They rally Marty's other tormented employees, while Jason calls his parents to tell them the truth about the weekend.

The next morning, Marty heads to the studio to begin filming Big Fat Liar, but his employees delay him through many mishaps. As Marty finally arrives, he encounters Jason, who kidnaps his stuffed monkey toy, Mr. Funnybones. Jason flees across the studio, luring Marty to a rooftop where he retrieves his toy and mocks Jason. Marty boastfully admits his actions, unaware the entire conversation is being witnessed by Jason's parents, the media, and Marcus, who immediately fires him. Jason thanks Marty for teaching him an important lesson about the truth. Marty furiously tries to attack him, but Jason leaps off the building and safely lands on a stunt cushion, where he finally regains his parents' trust.

Universal produces Big Fat Liar soon after Marty's firing while using the skills of people he had abused. The film becomes a critical success, and Jason receives full credit for writing his original story. Meanwhile, Marty declares bankruptcy and begins a new job as a birthday clown. At a party, the Masher orders his son, Darren, to kick Marty in his crotch.

Cast

Kenan Thompson, Dustin Diamond and the film's director Shawn Levy appear as guests at the after party of the premiere of Wolf's action comedy Whitaker and Fowl, which they criticize. Jaleel White also appears uncredited as himself, starring as Officer Fowl in Whitaker and Fowl. White is annoyed that Wolf often calls him "Urkel".

Production

Filming

Big Fat Liar was filmed from March to June 2001.

The film was filmed at Universal Studios Hollywood, the Flash Flood set, and Los Angeles International Airport, as well as in Glendale, Monrovia, Pasadena, and Whittier, California.

The exotic Intermec 6651 Handheld PC appears as the computer used by Lester Golub to help Jason by releasing a stream of water into Marty's path.

Soundtrack
The film's soundtrack was released by Mercury Records in 2002.

Release
The film was released in cinemas on February 8, 2002 by Universal Pictures and was released on VHS and DVD on September 24, 2002 by Universal Studios Home Entertainment. The DVD release contains an unlockable cheat code for Spyro 2: Season of Flame that turns Spyro the Dragon blue, as seen in one of Jason's pranks on Marty. It was released on Blu-ray on March 4, 2014.

Reception

Box office
The film grossed $48.4 million in the United States and Canada and $4.6 million in other countries for a worldwide total of $53 million, against a budget of $15 million.

The film grossed $11.6 million in its opening weekend, finishing in second at the box office behind Collateral Damage ($15.1 million).

Critical response
On Rotten Tomatoes, the film has an approval rating of 45% based on 94 reviews, with an average rating of 5/10. The site's critical consensus read, "Though there's nothing that offensive about Big Fat Liar, it is filled with Hollywood cliches and cartoonish slapstick, making it strictly for kids." Metacritic assigned the film a weighted average score 36 out of 100 based on 24 critics, indicating "generally unfavorable reviews". Audiences polled by CinemaScore gave the film an average grade of "A−" on an A+ to F scale.

Some critics called the film energetic and witty, but others called it dull and formulaic. Ebert and Roeper gave it "Two Thumbs Up". In his review for the Chicago Sun-Times Ebert gave it 3 out of 4, and called it "A surprisingly entertaining movie [...] ideal for younger kids, and not painful for their parents." Michael O'Sullivan of The Washington Post called the film "an innocent comedic revenge fantasy that somehow manages to be sweet and wickedly satisfying at the same time."

Accolades

Sequel
In August 2016, it was announced that a standalone sequel had begun principal photography. Bigger Fatter Liar starred Ricky Garcia as Kevin Shepherd, Jodelle Ferland as Becca, and Barry Bostwick as Larry Wolf. The plot though unrelated to the first film, was similar in many ways to Big Fat Liar. Released directly to DVD in April 2017, the film was met with critical and commercial failure. It was later released on Blu-ray in July 2018.

Potential future
In March 2022, Shawn Levy revealed that he has always wanted to make a direct-sequel to Big Fat Liar, stating that the plot would include a Marty Wolf revenge story. The filmmaker referenced the revitalized Real Steel franchise in the form of the upcoming television series, as hope for a future Big Fat Liar sequel to be made.

References

External links

 
 
 

2000s adventure comedy films
2000s screwball comedy films
2000s teen comedy films
2002 films
American adventure comedy films
American screwball comedy films
American teen comedy films
American spy comedy films
2000s English-language films
Films about filmmaking
Films about lying
Films about pranks
Films about theft
American films about revenge
Films directed by Shawn Levy
Films scored by Christophe Beck
Films set in Los Angeles
Films set in Michigan
Films set in studio lots
Films shot in Los Angeles
Films with screenplays by Dan Schneider
Universal Pictures films
2002 comedy films
2000s American films